Rig Rural District is in the Central District of Lordegan County, Chaharmahal and Bakhtiari province, Iran. At the census of 2006, its population was 12,171 in 2,378 households; there were 13,511 inhabitants in 3,079 households at the following census of 2011; and in the most recent census of 2016, the population of the rural district was 12,757 in 3,444 households. The largest of its 24 villages was Monjar Mui, with 2,778 people.

References 

Lordegan County

Rural Districts of Chaharmahal and Bakhtiari Province

Populated places in Chaharmahal and Bakhtiari Province

Populated places in Lordegan County